The Big Sound is an album recorded by American jazz saxophonist Johnny Hodges featuring performances with members of the Duke Ellington Orchestra recorded in 1957 and released on the Verve label.

Reception

The AllMusic review by Bob Rusch stated: "While it was not an Ellington record, the band brought its solid qualities in backing and the occasional solo to all the fine Hodges features. This was an integrated unit, not some detached studio band for Hodges to blow over, under, around, and through. It was wonderful Hodges and fine Ellington".

Track listing
All compositions by Johnny Hodges, except as indicated.
 "Don't Call Me, I'll Call You" (Cat Anderson) - 3:28
 "An Ordinary Thing" (Anderson) - 3:20
 "Waiting for Duke" (Anderson) - 3:58
 "Dust Bowl" - 4:26
 "Little Rabbit Blues" - 9:26
 "Viscount" (Hodges, Mercer Ellington) - 2:30
 "Johnny Come Lately" (Billy Strayhorn) - 2:27
 "Bouquet of Roses" (Hodges, Mercer Ellington) - 3:23
 "Gone and Crazy" - 3:14
 "Digits" (Clark Terry) - 4:18
 "Segdoh" - 3:28
 "Early Morning Rock" - 3:34

Personnel
Johnny Hodges - alto saxophone
Cat Anderson (tracks 1-4), Shorty Baker (tracks 1-4, 6, 8, 10 & 12), Willie Cook (tracks 1-4), Clark Terry - trumpet
Ray Nance - trumpet, violin
Quentin Jackson, John Sanders, Britt Woodman (tracks 1-5, 7, 9 & 11) - trombone
Jimmy Hamilton - clarinet, tenor saxophone
Russell Procope - alto saxophone, clarinet
Paul Gonsalves - tenor saxophone (tracks 1-4)
Harry Carney - baritone saxophone
Billy Strayhorn - piano
Jimmy Woode - bass
Sam Woodyard - drums

References

1957 albums
Johnny Hodges albums
Verve Records albums
Albums produced by Norman Granz